The Vermilion River is a river in the Hudson Bay drainage basin in Kenora District in Northwestern Ontario, Canada.

Tributaries
Tully Creek (right)
Bump Creek (left)
Sigurd Creek (right)
Per Creek (left)

See also
List of rivers of Ontario

References

Rivers of Kenora District
Tributaries of Hudson Bay